Memorial High School may refer to:

United States

As Memorial High School alone

Memorial High School (Millville, New Jersey)
Memorial High School (West New York, New Jersey)
Memorial High School (St. Marys, Ohio)
Memorial High School (Tulsa, Oklahoma)
Memorial High School (Hedwig Village, Texas), with a Houston mailing address
Memorial High School (Port Arthur, Texas)
Memorial High School (Victoria, Texas)
Memorial High School (Eau Claire, Wisconsin)
Memorial High School (Frisco, Texas)

With Memorial High School in the name
Amityville Memorial High School — Amityville, New York
Arlington Memorial School — Arlington, Vermont
Ballard Memorial High School — Barlow, Kentucky
Beloit Memorial High School — Beloit, Wisconsin
Billerica Memorial High School — Billerica, Massachusetts
Bishop Amat Memorial High School — La Puente, California
Brick Township Memorial High School — Brick, New Jersey
Campbell Memorial High School (Ohio) — Campbell, Ohio
Catholic Memorial High School — Waukesha, Wisconsin
Cimarron-Memorial High School — North Las Vegas, Nevada
Civic Memorial High School — Bethalto, Illinois
Doherty Memorial High School — Worcester, Massachusetts
Edmond Memorial High School — Edmond, Oklahoma
Elkhart Memorial High School — Elkhart, Indiana
Ellender Memorial High School — Houma, Louisiana
Elmont Memorial High School — Elmont, New York
Elmwood Park Memorial High School — Elmwood Park, New Jersey
Ely Memorial High School — Ely, Minnesota
Floral Park Memorial High School — Floral Park, New York
Florence Township Memorial High School; Florence, New Jersey 
G. A. R. Memorial Junior Senior High School — Wilkes-Barre, Pennsylvania
Garces Memorial High School — Bakersfield, California
Granby Memorial High School — Granby, Connecticut
Memorial High School, Haddonfield — Haddonfield, New Jersey
Jackson Memorial High School — Jackson, New Jersey
James Madison Memorial High School — Madison, Wisconsin, widely known as "Memorial High School"
John Bapst Memorial High School — Bangor, Maine
John F. Kennedy Memorial High School (Mississippi) — Mound Bayou, Mississippi
John F. Kennedy Memorial High School (New Jersey) — Iselin, New Jersey
Judge Memorial Catholic High School — Salt Lake City, Utah
Kellenberg Memorial High School — Uniondale, New York
Lloyd Memorial High School — Erlanger, Kentucky
Lyman Memorial High School — Lebanon, Connecticut
Machias Memorial High School — Machias, Maine
Manchester Memorial High School — Manchester, New Hampshire
McAllen Memorial High School — McAllen, Texas
Monsignor McClancy Memorial High School — Elmhurst, New York
New Hyde Park Memorial High School — New Hyde Park, New York
Newark Memorial High School — Newark, California
Pasadena Memorial High School — Pasadena, Texas
Peabody Veterans Memorial High School — Peabody, Massachusetts
Pelham Memorial High School — Pelham, New York
Pennsville Memorial High School — Pennsville, New Jersey
Pharr-San Juan-Alamo Memorial High School — Alamo, Texas
Picayune Memorial High School — Picayune, Mississippi
Reading Memorial High School — Reading, Massachusetts
Reitz Memorial High School — Evansville, Indiana
Rice Memorial High School — South Burlington, Vermont
Ridgefield Memorial High School — Ridgefield, New Jersey
San Joaquin Memorial High School — Fresno, California
Sayreville War Memorial High School — Sayreville, New Jersey
Scecina Memorial High School — Indianapolis, Indiana
Seeger Memorial Junior-Senior High School — West Lebanon, Indiana
Tewksbury Memorial High School — Tewksbury, Massachusetts
Tourtellotte Memorial High School — Grosvenordale, Connecticut
Waldo J. Wood Memorial Jr/Sr High School — Oakland City, Indiana
Watkins Memorial High School — Pataskala, Ohio
Wilson Memorial High School — Fishersville, Virginia

Australia
Farrer Memorial Agricultural High School — Tamworth, New South Wales

Canada
Banting Memorial High School — Alliston, Ontario
James M. Hill Memorial High School — Miramichi, New Brunswick
Memorial Composite High School — Stony Plain, Alberta
Yarmouth Consolidated Memorial High School — Yarmouth, Nova Scotia
École John Stubbs Memorial School — Colwood, British Columbia

India
A. J. John Memorial High School — Kavilumpara, Kerala
Dr. S. Hussain Zaheer Memorial High School — Hyderabad, Andhra Pradesh
Olcott Memorial High School — Chennai, Tamil Nadu

Nigeria
Apata Memorial High School — Lagos

See also
Catholic Memorial School — Boston, Massachusetts